is a Japanese yuri science fiction novel series written by Iori Miyazawa and illustrated by shirakaba. Inspired by the novel Roadside Picnic by Arkady and Boris Strugatsky, Hayakawa Publishing have released eight volumes of the series since February 2017. A manga adaptation with art by Eita Mizuno has been serialized since February 2018 via Square Enix's shōnen manga magazine Monthly Shōnen Gangan, and has been collected in ten tankōbon volumes. The novels are licensed in North America by J-Novel Club, while the manga is licensed by Square Enix. An anime television series adaptation by Liden Films and Felix Film aired from January to March 2021.

Synopsis
College student Sorawo Kamikoshi explores "doors" which randomly lead into the Otherside—parallel worlds in which internet creepypasta and urban legends are brought to life. Sorawo nearly dies in one of these worlds while encountering a creepypasta monster, but is rescued by Toriko Nishina, another young woman who is skilled with guns and is looking for a lost friend. Sorawo and Toriko, with the help of another woman named Kozakura, return to the Otherside to bring back artifacts and defeat the monsters, but the two are increasingly affected by the conditions of the worlds, meet other humans who are trapped in them, and find themselves increasingly affected by each other.

Characters

A sophomore at a university in Saitama Prefecture. She loves and has a wealth of knowledge about urban legends and real-life ghost stories. She enjoys exploring abandoned buildings, and discovered the existence of the Otherside through a door she found while doing so. She doesn't have many friends, but Toriko, who she met in the Otherside, invites her to go there to explore, research, and earn money. Her mother instantly died in an accident, and her grandmother and father became devoted to a cult afterwards, causing her to repeatedly run away from home and explore abandoned houses to escape her disintegrating family, which was persuading her to join the cult, but after her grandmother and father died, she is now attending college on a scholarship.

A woman who searches the Otherside for her missing friend Satsuki. She appears to be a college student. Both of her mothers have passed away; one was a soldier in Joint Task Force 2, a special operations force of the Canadian army, so Toriko is familiar with firearms. She has long blond hair and is, in the opinion of Sorawo, "extremely beautiful". Her character in the story is very positive, but she has a tendency to isolate herself from others, and has no friends other than Sorawo and Satsuki, who was Toriko's tutor.

A researcher of the Otherside who has a residence near Shakujii Park. A friend of Satsuki's from her college days, she was concerned about Satsuki's investigation of the Otherside because it was dangerous and had warned her many times. When Satsuki ignores her warnings and continues with her research, she goes missing, which makes her angry and frustrated with Satsuki. When Sorawo first meets Kozakura, she looks so young that she gives off the impression of being in grade school, but she appears to be older than Sorawo and Toriko, and is shown drinking and driving a car. As a hobby, she has created an avatar named  on the Internet and has been streaming videos. The image of Yozakura is based on that of her friend Satsuki. In the past, she created another avatar based on her own image, but destroyed it due to the increase in the number of fans who disagreed with her intentions. For Sorawo and Toriko, she is a client of the goods they obtained during their exploration of the Otherside, and is in the position of a consultant. The artifacts that Sorawo and Toriko have acquired in the Otherside are purchased by Kozakura, while the funds to purchase them are provided by the DS Research Encouragement Association, a research organization that Satsuki and Kozakura joined to conduct research on the Otherside.

Kozakura's peer who was exploring the Otherside. She disappears three months before the start of the story. She is a tall woman with long black hair and thick-rimmed glasses. She invited her friend Kozakura to be her partner in order to expand her investigation of the Otherside, but Kozakura was afraid of the Otherside and refused, so she went to search for a promising replacement partner. Toriko Nishina was one of them.

A freshman student studying at the same university as Sorawo. She is a karate practitioner and won the prefectural tournament in high school. She is from Saitama, but lives alone in an apartment because her parents moved away for work reasons. Her personality is bright and curious.

A man who serves as the Director General of DS. Although he is not a researcher himself, he once went to Central America during his adolescence because of his devotion to Carlos Castaneda, and he has a tattoo of Maya scripts on his arm. He is skilled in the use of firearms, traps, and torture, and has a personal connection to a private military company, making him a man of many mysteries.

Akari's childhood friend and confidant. After graduating from high school, she did not go on to higher education, but instead works at her family's garage.

Media

Novels
Otherside Picnic is written by Iori Miyazawa and illustrated by shirakaba. Hayakawa Publishing have published eight volumes since February 2017, while J-Novel Club have released seven volumes in North America.

Manga
A manga adaptation by Eita Mizuno was announced in November 2017. The manga began serialization in February 2018 via Square Enix's shōnen manga magazine Monthly Shōnen Gangan, and has been collected in ten tankōbon volumes. In July 2020, Square Enix announced that they would publish the manga in North America.

Anime
The 12-episode anime television series produced by Liden Films and Felix Film was announced on March 5, 2020. It was directed and written by Takuya Satō. Ayumi Nishihata designed the characters, and Takeshi Watanabe composed the series' music. The series aired from January 4 to March 22, 2021 on AT-X, Tokyo MX, SUN, and BS11. The opening theme song is  performed by CHiCO with HoneyWorks, while the ending theme song is "You & Me" performed by Miki Satō.

Funimation had licensed the series and streamed it on its website in North America and the British Isles, in Europe (minus Germany) through Wakanim, and in Australia and New Zealand through AnimeLab. On November 14, 2021, Funimation announced the series would receive an English dub, which premiered the following day. Following Sony's acquisition of Crunchyroll, the series was moved to Crunchyroll. In Germany, the series is licensed by KSM Anime. Medialink has licensed the series in Southeast Asia and South Asia, and streamed it on their Ani-One YouTube channel and Bilibili in Southeast Asia.

Reception
Constance Sarantos of CBR says that the series breaks the mold of the yuri genre, avoiding common stereotypes of the genre and creating a unique narrative, defying, in their view, "expectations for a yuri anime" as it delves into the horror genre and has a "Relationship built on crime and survival" rather than a slice of life about "interpersonal romantic drama." Sarantos also said that the series shows how well the sci-fi and yuri genres can mix, combining themes of fear and romance, something which isn't often used in yuri anime, with the protagonists having to "work together to defeat frightening foes." Even so, Sarantos stated that while the anime doesn't "deconstruct the yuri genre" it shares storyboarding which "emphasizes intimate moments and loneliness" with Bloom Into You, Just Call it Love, Fragtime, Liz and the Blue Bird, and Adachi and Shimamura, among others, utilizing the "emotional scenery one would expect from a yuri series." In that respect, Sarantos said that it is similar to Kemono Friends and Girls' Last Tour, adding that there is an expectation it will "nail the aesthetic of yuri" even though it is an "unconventional yuri narrative." 

Reviewers for Anime News Network shared the sentiment of Sarantos. Caitlin Moore called the series "one of a kind" and a welcome addition to a series of yuri anime about "teenagers falling blushingly in love for the first time", with neither of the protagonists, Sorawo or Toriko, based on stereotypes. Even so, Moore said that the chemistry between them "could have come through stronger", called the visuals a "mixed bag" and said that there has been "a real lack of queer genre fiction in anime" recently, meaning she is "all the more excited to explore it." James Beckett, on the other hand, said that he was only lukewarm to the anime and said that while he is "not asking the show to answer all of my questions upfront", he would like "a little more context" and that he hopes that it "manages to live up to its potential." Similarly, Nicholas Dupree said that he feels the show lost him the premiere, even while he called the two protagonists a "charming central couple", and can't "click with the episode as a whole" while Theron Martin was more positive, saying that the series could be "worth watching" just for the interactions between the two protagonists. Just as positive was Rebecca Silverman, saying that the series was fascinating and creepy, saying it will likely be a faithful adaptation of the yuri manga it is based on, while saying there are "a few little missteps" and would like to know more "about the whole urban legend/internet myths piece" too. Hannah Alton of CBR argued that the series stands apart from the "usual fare" of the isekai genre because it is a yuri series, with the protagonists not trapped in the other world, but can easily move from the real world to the fictional world known as the Otherside, with the danger within the Otherside, which is "populated by monsters from Japanese urban legends" which can't be killed unless someone looks directly at them.

Alton further says the two protagonists standout in the genre, with Sorawo as a college student who "keeps to herself" and Toriko who is experienced at using a gun, something which violates existing Japanese law, which tightly controls firearms. Alton concludes by saying that while the anime falls into the isekai genre, it is different "from the usual high fantasy adventures in empowerment." Others have praised the anime, along with Moyasimon and Genshiken, saying that this prove that college anime can "offer a different take on "coming of age" storylines than the standard high school tropes" while focusing on "serious adult issues" like interpersonal conflict, struggles over identity, and mental health. Additionally, Christopher Farris reviewed the anime's fourth episode for Anime News Network, noting that the vibes and ideas of the episode fit the series, while pointing to inconsistencies with the storytelling, and stating that within the theme of fear, everything else "works wonderfully", praising the sound design and how it taps into people's fears. Jordan Ramée of GameSpot praised the anime for starring adults, unlike most anime, calling it a "a refreshingly wonderful series" which has a "pretty cute and wholesome romance."

Erica Friedman had a mixed view of Otherside Picnic, which she reviewed on her blog, Okazu. She praised the novel series as "an overt mix of Japanese netlore, science fiction, action and horror tropes and a big scoop of Yuri", but she was a "little disappointed" in the anime, specifically criticizing the animation style, disliking what she described as "comedy-action" in the series, and the pacing. Even so, she called the anime "very enjoyable" and praised the voice acting as "superb". Ultimately, she called the animation "unsatisfying", said the story was not "compelling", criticized what she saw as "pointless service" in the series, and said that the anime "feels like a children's version of the novels", giving the anime an overall rating of 7 out of 10.

Silverman reviewed the Otherside Picnic manga for Anime News Network, writing that it does not have "some of the issues that plagued the anime version," with more of a focus on horror, and gives readers "a little more yuri," saying it tells a unique story while "remaining true to the source novels." She argued that it feels like a "a statement on the isekai craze of recent years," and concluded it was a "solid adaptation...worth reading all on its own."

Notes

References

External links
  
  
 

2017 Japanese novels
2020s Japanese LGBT-related television series
2021 anime television series debuts
Adventure anime and manga
Anime and manga based on novels
AT-X (TV network) original programming
Crunchyroll anime
Felix Film
Gangan Comics manga
Girls with guns anime and manga
Isekai anime and manga
Isekai novels and light novels
J-Novel Club books
Japanese LGBT-related animated television series
Japanese science fiction novels
LGBT speculative fiction novels
Liden Films
Medialink
Novels with lesbian themes
Science fiction anime and manga
Shōnen manga
Yuri (genre) anime and manga